Clustered mitochondria (cluA/CLU1) homolog is a protein in humans that is encoded by the CLUH gene.

References

Further reading 

Genes on human chromosome 17